Anthophora plagiata is a species of insect belonging to the family Apidae which is native to Eurasia.

Description

Distribution
Anthophora plagiata can be found in Spain, France, Belgium, Italy, Switzerland, Germany, Denmark, Czechia, Poland and Croatia.

References

Apidae